Fronteira may refer to the following places:

Brazil
Fronteira, Minas Gerais 
Fronteira dos Vales, Minas Gerais
São João da Fronteira Piauí
Três Fronteiras, São Paulo

Portugal
Fronteira, Portugal, a municipality in Portalegre District
Fronteira (parish), a parish in Portalegre District

See also

Fronteiras